Ofelia Hernandez is a former mayor of Huntington Park, California.

In March 2003, Hernandez was elected to serve a 4-year term on the 5-member Huntington Park City Council. In March 2005, she was appointed as mayor by the City Council. In March 2007, she won re-election to the City Council and repeated her success in the March 2011 election. In March 2013, she was appointed mayor.

References

Living people
Mayors of places in California
Women mayors of places in California
People from Huntington Park, California
Year of birth missing (living people)
California city council members
Women city councillors in California
Hispanic and Latino American mayors in California
Hispanic and Latino American politicians
Hispanic and Latino American women in politics
21st-century American women